The Malaprabha River (Kannada ಮಲಪ್ರಭಾ ನದಿ) is a tributary of the Krishna River and flows through the state of Karnataka in India. The river joins Krishna River at Kudalasangama in Bagalkot districtby

Geography
At the origin of the Malaprabha is an ancient temple dedicated to Shree Mauli Devi. The temple is in R.S. No. 127 of Kankumbi. Malaprabha birthplace is a pilgrimage center with mythological origins. A symbol in rock carved by hand near the source of the river Malaprabha depicts the origin of the river for the purpose of safety showered for the well being of humankind. It is a source of highly stable mineral water. Presence of discontinuities has major effects on properties of contours at source of river. Permeability is dependent on orientation of the region.

Tributaries
Bennihalla, Hirehalla and Tuparihalla are the major tributaries to Malaprabha of Dharwad district.

Reservoir

Navilatirtha Dam (Navilu in Kannada means peacock) is between Saundatti and Munavalli in Belgaum District.

Pilgrimage centre
There is an ancient temple of the deity Yellamma on a nearby hill. This is a pilgrimage centre for thousands of devotees. Also the temples of Aihole, Pattadakal and Badami are on the banks of the Malaprabha. These are listed as World Heritage Sites by UNESCO.

See also
 The Kalasa-Banduri Nala project
 Mahakuta

References

External links

Rivers of Karnataka
Tributaries of the Krishna River
Geography of Belagavi district
Rivers of India